University of Wales, Lampeter, originally known as St David's College and later St David's University College, was the oldest degree-awarding institution in Wales. It was founded in 1822 by Thomas Burgess, Bishop of St Davids, and given its royal charter by George IV in 1828.

The college was originally intended for the teaching of Welsh male clergy, and as a result maintained a number of Professors of Theology and Latin. It later began teaching a wide ranger of subjects, including Archaeology, Classics, English, Hebrew, Welsh, and Philosophy. In 1965, the college began accepting female students for the first time. It was renamed St David's University College in 1971 after joining the federal University of Wales, and in 1996 renamed again to University of Wales, Lampeter. In 2010, the college merged with Trinity University College to form the University of Wales Trinity Saint David.

This list includes those who worked as lecturers, readers, professors, fellows, and researchers at University of Wales, Lampeter. Those who were academics of the university as well as alumni are included on the list of alumni of University of Wales, Lampeter. Those who were academics of the university as well as Principals or Vice-Chancellors are included on the list of vice-chancellors of the University of Wales, Trinity Saint David.

Archaeology

Classics

English

Geography

History

Languages

Mathematics

Philosophy

Theology

Other

See also
List of vice-chancellors of the University of Wales, Trinity Saint David
List of alumni of University of Wales, Lampeter

References

Academics of the University of Wales, Lampeter
Wales, Lampeter